The Conesauga Formation is a geologic formation in Alabama. It preserves fossils dating back to the Cambrian period.

See also

 List of fossiliferous stratigraphic units in Alabama
 Paleontology in Alabama

References
 

Cambrian Alabama
Cambrian southern paleotemperate deposits